David McGuinness (born 18 July 1986)  is an Irish former independent politician who was elected to Fingal County Council on 5 June 2009, becoming Dublin West's youngest Councillor, at the age of 22.

Biography
McGuinness was born and raised in Sheephill Park, Corduff, Blanchardstown. His schooling started at St Patrick's primary school, Corduff while progressing to second level education at Riversdale community college. McGuinness graduated from Trinity College Dublin with an Honors bachelor's degree in Music, Education and History. Having become Fianna Fáil's youngest  County councillor  in Ireland, on being elected to Fingal County Council in June 2009 for the Mulhuddart Local Electoral Area, McGuinness subsequently ran on a two-person ticket in the  2011 general election with Brian Lenihan Jnr, which helped secure Fianna Fáil's only seat in Dublin that year. McGuiness was selected the following October by Fianna Fáil Dublin West, to contest the by-election caused by the death of his colleague Brian Lenihan. McGuiness contested the 2011 Dublin West by-election. Representing Fianna Fáil, McGuinness received 21.7% of the first preference vote (7,742 votes), and ultimately finishing second, while increasing his party's support from the Dublin West election by 5%.

In April 2015, McGuinness resigned from Fianna Fail indicating that he could not support a party who chose a candidate to run in the 2016 Irish general election with no life experience or working record. McGuinness also indicated that he was never in Fianna Fail to ensure its survival but to use it as a means to provide fair public representation for his entire constituency. He did not contest the 2019 local elections.

References

External links

Living people
1986 births
Fianna Fáil politicians